Alfred Coleman (1890—1952) was an artist in Victoria, Australia, Australia. He was active in the 1920s and painted in the impressionist style. He is best known for his landscapes and seascapes.

Awards
Coleman won the Albury Prize in 1952.

Works
His works include:
 Beaumaris Cliffs

References

1890 births
1952 deaths
Australian Impressionist painters
20th-century Australian painters
20th-century Australian male artists
Australian landscape painters
Australian marine artists
Australian male painters